Qanun or Kanun may refer to:

Qanun (law): laws promulgated by Muslim sovereigns, in particular the Ottoman Sultans, in contrast to shari'a, the body of law elaborated by Muslim jurists.
Qanun (instrument), a large zither played in and around the Middle East
Kanun (Albania), the traditional clan law of Albania
Kānūn al-Awwal and Kānūn ath-Thānī, the names for December and January in Arabic and Rumi calendars
Qanun-e dâr Tâb  (The Canon of Medicine), a 1025 AD medical encyclopedia by Ibn Sīnā (Avicenna)
Qanun, influential Iranian newspaper, edited by Mirza Malkam Khan between 1890 and 1898 in London

See also
Canon (disambiguation)
Kanon (disambiguation)
Kanoon (disambiguation)
Qanuni, surname
QAnon, a far-right conspiracy theory

ar:قانون
nl:Qanûn
ur:قانون